María Encarnación Duchi Guaman (born 1977) is an Ecuadorian politician and a member of the Pachakutik Plurinational Unity Movement – New Country. She served in the Ecuador's National Assembly.

Life 
Duchi's hometown was Chorocopte and she was born in about 1977. Her father was a leading figure in their community and she decided to become a lawyer to support him. She first took a degree in Educational Sciences at the Army Polytechnic School before going on to quality in law at Private Technical University of Loja in 2007. By 2014 she had a masters degree in administrative law.

She joined the Pachakutik Plurinational Unity Movement – New Country, but she never imagined that she would have a role in politics. In her home she had been sent to fetch water from the river and light to read and study came from candles, but in 2017 she was elected to the Ecuador's National Assembly from 2017 and served until 2021.

References 

Living people
Members of the National Assembly (Ecuador)
Women members of the National Assembly (Ecuador)
21st-century Ecuadorian politicians
21st-century Ecuadorian women politicians
1977 births